Franz Weidenreich (7 June 1873 – 11 July 1948) was a Jewish German anatomist and physical anthropologist who studied evolution.

Life and career
Weidenreich studied at the Kaiser-Wilhelm-Universität in Strasbourg where he earned a medical degree in 1899. From 1921 to 1924 he served as a Professor of anthropology at the University of Heidelberg and was a visiting professor at the University of Chicago in 1934. In 1935 he succeeded Canadian paleoanthropologist Davidson Black as honorary director of the Cenozoic Research Laboratory of the Geological Survey of China. Weidenreich was among the scientists to claim that Piltdown Man was a "chimera", a composite between two unrelated species, long before fluoride analyses proved that Piltdown Man was a hoax. Weidenreich also renamed Gigantopithecus blacki to Giganthropus blacki, based on a theory that primitive forms of man were much larger than the more recent ones. However, as this theory is contradictory to the Cope-Depéret rule (which states that in straight evolution lines of non-flying animals the size of species increases, not the other way round), it was rejected by Professor Dr. von Koenigswald when he returned from the Japanese concentration camp after the Second World War.

As honorary director of the Cenozoic Research Laboratory he also studied fossils of the Peking Man, then known as Sinanthropus pekinensis, unearthed at Zhoukoudian, China.  Weidenreich originated the "Weidenreich Theory of Human Evolution" based on his examination of Peking Man.  Being an anatomist, Weidenreich observed numerous anatomical characteristics that Peking Man had in common with modern Chinese, this led to his Polycentric evolution model of human origins.

Peter H. Wyden, American journalist and writer, was one of his nephews and U.S. Senator Ron Wyden is a grandnephew.

Polycentric evolution

Weidenreich pioneered the Polycentric (multiregional) hypothesis, which proposed that human populations have evolved independently in the Old World from Homo erectus to Homo sapiens sapiens, while at the same time there was gene flow between the various populations.

A vocal proponent of the Weidenreich Theory was Carleton Coon; however, Coon modified Weidenreich's Polycentric view of evolution, since he stressed far less on gene flow.

References

Further reading

External links
 Franz Weidenreich and Gigantopithecus

1873 births
1948 deaths
People from Edenkoben
19th-century German Jews
German anthropologists
German anatomists
German paleoanthropologists
Human evolution theorists
University of Strasbourg alumni
Academic staff of the University of Strasbourg
Jewish Chinese history
German expatriates in China
People from the Palatinate (region)